Old Carthusians may refer to:
 Old Carthusians F.C., an English football club
 List of Old Carthusians, a list of notable alumni of Charterhouse School